J. S. Raju was an Indian politician and former Member of the Legislative Assembly of Tamil Nadu. He was elected to the Tamil Nadu legislative assembly as a Dravida Munnetra Kazhagam candidate from Perambalur constituency in the 1967, 1971 and 1980 elections.

References 

Dravida Munnetra Kazhagam politicians
Members of the Tamil Nadu Legislative Assembly
Year of birth missing
Possibly living people